The 1993 Maui Invitational Tournament was an early-season college basketball tournament that was played, for the 10th time, from December 22 to December 24, 1993. The tournament, which began in 1984, was part of the 1993-94 NCAA Division I men's basketball season.  The tournament was played at the Lahaina Civic Center in Maui, Hawaii and was won by the Kentucky Wildcats. It was the first title for the program and its head coach Rick Pitino.

Bracket

References

Maui Invitational Tournament
Maui Invitational